Karriella is a genus of Western Australian sheetweb spiders that was first described by M. R. Gray & H. M. Smith in 2008.  it contains two species, found in Western Australia: K. treenensis and K. walpolensis.

See also
 List of Stiphidiidae species

References

Araneomorphae genera
Spiders of Australia
Stiphidiidae